A multi-bearer network, or an MBN, is a network having the capability to carry a data packet via one of several alternative bearers. To be more precise, the term multi-bearer network should be interpreted as meaning ‘multi-bearer-type network’, or in other words, a network arrangement which provides multiple different bearer types for data packet delivery.

Background of multi-bearer network 
An example of a suitable MBN is a concept known as Multimedia Environment for Mobiles (MEMO). Additionally, the MBN supports mobility of a subscriber terminal. An example of terminal mobility is IP mobility, which is the topic of standard  by the IETF. 
The problem underlying the invention is how to select the optimal bearer for each data packet in varying situations in a multi-bearer network. Data packets have different quality-of-service requirements. Situations may vary because the subscriber moves or the network load changes.

Brief summary of multi-bearer network 

From the patent

Multi bearer network usage by companies 
CyberVision
Huawei
PyCom

References

Mobility Support
Method for sending a data packet to a mobile node from a correspondent node via a multi-bearer network 
Mobile Broadband Consumption and Multi-bearer Network Strategies

External links
Packet routing in a multi-bearer-type network

Telecommunications infrastructure